Alexander Biagio Conti (born 1 September 1993) is a Canadian actor. He made his acting debut in the film Finding Forrester (2000). Since then, he has been nominated for five Young Artist Awards.

Biography 
Conti was born in Brantford, Ontario, of Italian and Brazilian heritage. He is the youngest of four children. His older brothers, Adam Conti and Jordan Conti, are also actors. His sister Brittany also aspires to be an actress. He has expressed his love of performing and has characterized continuing to act as his "greatest desire".  He has acted in commercials, radio, animation voice overs, and television series. His first real acting experience was in the Showtime Networks series, Street Time, on which he was a regular. He has also worked with Director Andy Wolk, alongside Peter Falk.

Film credits
Conti's film work includes roles in The Pacifier, Cheaper by the Dozen 2, and Case 39 (as Diego Ramirez).

He has roles in movies like: Gooby, The Good Witch 2 and the Disney Channel Original Movie, Harriet the Spy: Blog Wars as Sport.

Television credits

Awards and nominations

References

External links

1993 births
Living people
People from Brantford
Male actors from Ontario
Canadian people of Italian descent
Canadian people of Brazilian descent
Canadian male film actors
Canadian male television actors
Canadian male voice actors
Canadian male child actors